János Radoki (born 7 March 1972) is a German-Hungarian former professional footballer who played as a defender and current head coach of TSV Schwaben Augsburg.

Radoki was born in Hungary, but emigrated to Germany with his parents as a child. He holds German citizenship. He played his whole career in various German leagues, spending one season in the top division with SSV Ulm.

On 21 November 2016, Radoki was announced as the interim replacement for Stefan Ruthenbeck at Greuther Fürth, as the club was playing a disappointing season. He was sacked on 28 August 2017.

International career
Radoki was called up to the Hungarian national team in 2000 by captain Bertalan Bicskei. On 15 November 2000, he was nominated as a reserve player for the game against Macedonia, and he was already warming up to be substituted in when the game was abandoned due to the foggy weather. He was eventually never capped for Hungary.

Managerial career
On 29 December 2018, he was appointed as the manager of the Nemzeti Bajnokság I club Puskás Akadémia FC. He was released from his contract on 7 April following a 0-4 home loss against Kisvárda FC.

References

External links

1972 births
Living people
People from Mór
Sportspeople from Fejér County
Hungarian footballers
German footballers
Hungarian football managers
German football managers
Hungarian emigrants to West Germany
Association football defenders
FC Augsburg players
FC Augsburg II players
SpVgg Greuther Fürth players
SSV Ulm 1846 players
Rot-Weiß Oberhausen players
Bundesliga players
2. Bundesliga players
2. Bundesliga managers
SpVgg Greuther Fürth managers
Puskás Akadémia FC managers
TSV Schwaben Augsburg managers
Nemzeti Bajnokság I managers
West German footballers